The Saint of Bleecker Street is an opera in three acts by Gian Carlo Menotti to an original English libretto by the composer. It was first performed at the Broadway Theatre in New York City on December 27, 1954. David Poleri and Davis Cunningham alternated in the role of Michele, and Thomas Schippers conducted. It ran for 92 consecutive performances.

The opera is through-composed, and set in the intensely Catholic Little Italy of New York City in 1954. It follows Annina, a young and simple woman who is blessed with the stigmata. She often hears voices and has visions of the angels. Her brother, Michele, is an atheist who is intensely protective of his sister; he believes she requires hospitalization, but he cannot stop the rest of the neighborhood from believing her a saint.

The Saint of Bleecker Street won Menotti the Pulitzer Prize for Music in 1955 and the New York Drama Critics' Circle Award for Best Musical. Although it is not part of the standard operatic repertory, recordings of it exist, and it is occasionally performed.

The original set for The Saint of Bleecker Street was designed by the American symbolic realist painter George Tooker, and was based on elements from his painting The Subway, currently in the collection of the Whitney Museum of American Art.

Roles

Synopsis

Act 1
In her tenement on Bleecker Street, Annina has visions of Jesus Christ and wakes up to find stigmata on her hands ("Oh sweet Jesus, spare me the agony"). The neighbors and Don Marco, the neighborhood priest, believe that she is a saint with healing powers, but her protective brother Michele makes them leave and declares that her visions are simply the evidence of illness. Annina discovers to her dismay that her friend Carmela is going to be married instead of becoming a nun with Annina. Meanwhile, Michele has forbidden Annina from attending the annual Feast of San Gennaro. He mocks her religious beliefs and is determined to keep her from becoming a nun. However, the Sons of San Gennaro tie Michele to a fence on Mulberry Street and carry Annina away to the feast against his wishes.

Act 2
Annina and Michele attend Carmela's wedding reception at an Italian restaurant ("Be good to her, be kind"). Desideria, Michele's secret girlfriend, arrives without an invitation and announces that she has been kicked out of her mother's house and wants Michele to move in with her ("What does she ever do for you except light candles for your soul?... Ah Michele, don't you know"). Michele refuses because he doesn't want to leave his ill sister. When he tries to sneak Desideria into the reception, it starts a fight with other guests. Michele accuses the guests of throwing away their Italian heritage ("Although you made this land your home"). Michele and Annina decide to go home, but Desideria flies into a jealous rage and accuses him of being in love with his sister. Michele, enraged, stabs Desideria in the back and flees.

Act 3
Michele and Annina meet secretly in the subway ("You remember the time") and Annina begs Michele to turn himself in for Desideria's murder. When Michele refuses, Annina reveals that she is dying and intends to take the veil before she succumbs to illness. As her health deteriorates dangerously, Don Marco finally receives approval from the church to make Annina a nun. While Annina is taking her vows, Michele forces his way past watching neighbors and tries to convince her to give up her plans. However, Annina is too far gone to hear him and dies shortly after completing the ceremony.

References

External links
 The Saint of Bleecker Street page at the US Opera website
 

1954 operas
English-language operas
Operas by Gian Carlo Menotti
Operas set in the United States
Operas
Pulitzer Prize for Music-winning works
Tony Award-winning musicals